Frederick "Fred" Cheng (born 10 November 1983) is a Canadian-born Hong Kong musician and actor. He rose to fame after competing and winning the 2013 Hong Kong singing competition, Voice of the Stars. He is currently signed to TVB management.

Early life and Career
Cheng was born in Vancouver, British Columbia, Canada. Upon graduating from Eric Hamber Secondary School, he returned to Hong Kong. In 2001, Cheng's mother persuaded him to compete in the TVB New Talent Singing Awards, in which he won second place. Cheng was offered a contract to the record company Capital Artists, but after two months of training, the company stopped producing music. In 2003, TVB offered Cheng an artiste contract and offered him a role in the TVB drama Shine On You. He had starred in numerous television dramas, including Shine On You, Love Bond, The Charm Beneath and Forensic Heroes.

In 2011, Cheng signed a management contract with TVB.

In July 2013, Cheng competed in the inaugural season for the singing competition, The Voice of the Stars. He went on win the competition, winning 68% of the votes. Immediately after winning, Cheng was announced that he would be singing the theme song with Kristal Tin for the drama Return of the Silver Tongue.

On 15 November 2013, Cheng signed with TVB's newly established record company Voice Entertainment and released his debut solo album in the summer of 2014. He released his first single, "Nobody", on 24 March 2014 and within 5 hours it became the top selling single on Hong Kong iTunes and held the record for seven days. Subsequently, he was given a chance to sing another two theme songs for TVB dramas, The Ultimate Addiction and Ghost Dragon of Cold Mountain. He also won numerous best new artiste awards in 2014.

In March 2017, Cheng starred as the second male lead along with experienced and well-known actor, Gallen Lo in TVB drama 'Provocateur'.

After winning the VOS, Cheng has been given more job opportunities by TVB in acting, singing and commercial advertisements. He has performed events for companies including Towngas, Hopewell Holdings, New World Development, Shanghai Commercial Bank, AIA Group Limited, Swatch Group, Grand Lisboa, and P&G. Cheng also filmed for a number of commercial advertisements of companies such as Wellcome, P&G and Magic Smile B1.

On 15 September 2014 Cheng released his first album "Story of Panda". It reached number one on multiple sales charts within one week.

Personal life 
On 6 April 2017, Cheng admitted his relationship with fellow singer, Stephanie Ho. On 1 January 2020, the couple announced their engagement along with pre-wedding photos on Instagram, also revealing Cheng had proposed while they were on holiday in Thailand. The couple got married on 7 November 2020 and held their wedding at Hyatt Regency Sha Tin, Hong Kong.

On 13 January 2022, Ho announced on Instagram that she is pregnant. On 4 June, the couple announced on Instagram that their son, Asher Douglas Cheng, was born on 1 June.

Drama songs

Songs with Other Artistes
2013 TVB 46th Anniversary Celebration Theme Song - "Always Getting Better" 
2014 FIFA World Cup Theme Song - "We Are the Only One"  (Various Artists Chorus)
2014 TVB J2 Channel Song - "Vibrant Heart"

Awards

Jade Solid Gold Top 10 Awards
The Jade Solid Gold Songs Awards Ceremony is held annually in Hong Kong since 1984.  The awards are based on Jade Solid Gold show on TVB.

Hong Kong TVB8 Awards
The Hong Kong TVB8 Awards are given annually by TVB8, since 1999, a Mandarin television network operated by Television Broadcasts Limited.

TVB Star Awards 2014
TVB Star Awards Malaysia is organised by TVB to present awards to actors and actresses for their achievements.

Commercial Radio Hong Kong Ultimate Song Chart Awards
The Ultimate Song Chart Awards Presentation (叱咤樂壇流行榜頒獎典禮) is a cantopop award ceremony from one of the famous channel in Commercial Radio Hong Kong known as Ultimate 903 (FM 90.3).

RTHK Top 10 Gold Songs Awards
The RTHK Top 10 Gold Songs Awards Ceremony(:zh:十大中文金曲頒獎音樂會) is held annually in Hong Kong since 1978. The awards are determined by Radio and Television Hong Kong based on the work of all Asian artists (mostly cantopop) for the previous year.

Metro Showbiz Hit Awards
The Metro Showbiz Hit Awards (新城勁爆頒獎禮) is held in Hong Kong annually by Metro Showbiz radio station. It focuses mainly in cantopop music.

Metro Radio Mandarin Music Awards

IFPI Hong Kong Sales Awards
IFPI Awards is given to artists base on the sales in Hong Kong at the end of the year.

Other awards

Filmography

Television dramas

References

External links
 

1983 births
Living people
Canadian male film actors
TVB actors
Canadian male actors of Hong Kong descent
Male actors from Vancouver
Canadian emigrants to Hong Kong
21st-century Hong Kong male actors
Hong Kong male television actors
Canadian-born Hong Kong artists